Sulabha Deshpande (1937 – 4 June 2016) was an Indian actress and theatre director. Apart from Marathi theatre and Hindi theatre in Mumbai, she acted in over 73 mainstream Bollywood films. She also performed in art house cinema such as Bhumika (1977),  Arvind Desai Ki Ajeeb Dastaan (1978), and Gaman (1978) as a character actor, along with numerous TV series and plays. A leading figure in the experimental theatre movement of the 1960s, she was associated with Rangayan, and personalities like Vijay Tendulkar, Vijaya Mehta, and Satyadev Dubey. In 1971, she co-founded the theatre group Awishkar with her husband Arvind Deshpande, and also started its children's wing, Chandrashala, which continues to perform professional children's theatre. In later years, she acted in serials such as Jee Ley Zara, Ek Packet Umeed, Asmita and in films such as English Vinglish.

Early life
She was born and brought up in Mumbai, where she studied at Siddhartha College in Fort, Mumbai, and later received a degree in education.

Career
Deshpande started her career as a teacher at Chhabildas Boys' High School in Dadar, Mumbai. While working there she asked noted playwright, Vijay Tendulkar to write a few plays for her students. This started her association with theatre, and in time made her one of the pioneers in the experimental theatre movement of the 1960s, as she joined the group Rangayan, which was founded by Vijaya Mehta, Vijay Tendulkar, Arvind Deshpande and Shriram Lagoo. Soon, she started her acting career, though she first received acclaim when she won state-level competitions for her plays like Madhlya Bhintee and Sasaa Ani Kasav. After Rangayan dispersed, she along with her husband Arvind Deshpande, and Arun Kakade formed the theatre group, Awishkar in 1971. Having played the lead role of Leela Benare in Vijay Tendulkar's noted play Shantata! Court Chalu Ahe in 1967 she established her caliber. Later she reprised her role in the 1971 film version of the play directed by Satyadev Dubey, which turned out to be breakthrough role in feature films. Thereafter she went on to work extensively both in Hindi cinema as well as Marathi cinema, and directors like Shyam Benegal, through the height of Indian new wave cinema, in the 1970s and 1980s.

Awishkar was housed in the Chhabildas Hall at the Chhabildas Boys' High School, Mumbai, and thus gave rise to Chabildas theatre movement of amateur theatre. It also holds adult education workshops and trains young adults. Soon, she established the Chandrashala, the children's theatre wing of Awishkar, and directed plays like Baba Harvale Ahet, Raja Ranila Ghaam Hava and Pandit Pandit Tujhi Akkal Shendit and notably the Sangeet Natak, Durga jhali Gauri (Durga Became Gauri) in 1982, a dance drama with a cast of seventy children. She later directed the Hindi film version of the play Raja Ranila Ghaam Hava in 1978. After nearly 18 years of its establishment, Awishkar's association with Chhabildas school ended and the group restarted at the Mahim Municipal School, where it continues to hold its theatre productions, workshops and annual school production of Durga jhali Gauri performed by a new cast each year. Notable Bollywood actors Nana Patekar and Urmila Matondkar have been students of Chandrashala.
She was playing the role of Grandmother-in-law in Zee Marathi's Serial Asmita.

Personal life
She was married to noted theatre actor-director, Arvind Deshpande, who died in 1987.

Death
Sulabha Deshpande died on 4 June 2016 in Mumbai, after a prolonged illness. She was cremated the next day.

Selected filmography

Films

Television

Theatre

Awards
She was awarded the Sangeet Natak Akademi Award for theatre acting in Marathi and Hindi theatre in 1987, the award is given by the Sangeet Natak Akademi, India's National Academy of Music, Dance & Drama. It is the highest Indian recognition given to practising artists. She also received the award, Tanveer Sanman in 2010. She has also been honoured by various other awards like Nanasaheb Phatak Puraskar, Ganpatrao Joshi Puraskar, Vasantrao Kanetkar Puraskar, Kusumagraj Puraskar, Rangabhoomi Jeevan Gaurav Puraskar and Sarvashrestha Kalagaurav Puraskar by Sanskruti Kaladarpan.

References

External links
 Awishkar website
 
 

Indian stage actresses
Indian film actresses
Actresses in Hindi cinema
1937 births
2016 deaths
Actresses from Mumbai
Actresses in Marathi cinema
Actresses in Marathi theatre
Indian television actresses
Indian theatre directors
Recipients of the Sangeet Natak Akademi Award
Indian women theatre directors
20th-century Indian actresses
21st-century Indian actresses
Actresses in Hindi television
Businesspeople from Mumbai
20th-century Indian businesspeople
21st-century Indian businesspeople
20th-century Indian businesswomen
21st-century Indian businesswomen
Businesswomen from Maharashtra